José Cestero Rodríguez (Totin) (24 January 1938 in Río Piedras, Puerto Rico–10 May 2014) was a Puerto Rican former basketball player who competed in the 1960 Summer Olympics.

References

1938 births
2014 deaths
People from Río Piedras, Puerto Rico
Puerto Rican men's basketball players
1959 FIBA World Championship players
Olympic basketball players of Puerto Rico
Basketball players at the 1960 Summer Olympics
Basketball players at the 1959 Pan American Games
Pan American Games medalists in basketball
Pan American Games silver medalists for Puerto Rico
Medalists at the 1959 Pan American Games